Malice is the second studio album by Through the Eyes of the Dead, released in 2007. The album again features artwork from Paul Romano (Mastodon, The Red Chord). The band enlisted Erik Rutan (Hate Eternal, ex-Morbid Angel) for production, engineering and mixing, with Alan Douches (Unearth, Shadows Fall) of West West Side Music mastering the effort. The band travelled to Mana Studios in St. Petersburg, Florida, on February 16, and finished recording on March 15.

Malice is the band's only album to feature Nate Johnson (formerly of Premonitions of War and Deadwater Drowning) on vocals, as he left the band alongside drummer Josh Kulick in late 2007.

The album landed at number nine on Billboard'''s Heatseeker Chart, with first week sales of 3,400.

Critical receptionExclaim! wrote that Malice'' "is as outrageously chaotic as it is heavy, and has the ability to fully satiate any death metal lover's appetite for something raw."

Track listing

References

2007 albums
Through the Eyes of the Dead albums
Prosthetic Records albums
Albums produced by Erik Rutan